Gnaphosa muscorum is a ground spider species with Holarctic distribution. The subspecies G. muscorum gaunitzi is found in Sweden and Russia.

See also 
 List of Gnaphosidae species

References

External links 

Gnaphosidae
Holarctic spiders
Spiders of Russia
Spiders of Europe
Spiders described in 1866